The U.S. state of Oregon established vote-by-mail as the standard mechanism for voting with Ballot Measure 60, a citizen's initiative, in 1998. The measure made Oregon the first state in the United States to conduct its elections exclusively by mail. The measure passed on November 3, 1998, by a margin of 69.4% to 30.6%.

History of postal voting in Oregon
Vote-by-mail had already been implemented to a lesser degree in Oregon:
1981 The Oregon Legislative Assembly approves vote-by-mail for local elections, at the discretion of the county; at least one polling place in the county had to remain open on election day. The move came after efforts by Del Riley, the County Clerk for Linn County.
1987 Vote-by-mail becomes permanent, with the majority of Oregon's counties making use of it.
1989 A House bill to extend vote-by-mail to include the 1990 primary elections was defeated in a 33–27, non-party-line vote.
 1992 Governor's Task Force on Local Government Services identifies statewide vote-by-mail as one of the most significant opportunities to save money on conducting elections.
1995 Oregon becomes the first state to conduct a federal primary election totally by mail.
1996 U.S Senator Ron Wyden is elected by mail with a 66% turnout, succeeding Bob Packwood. ''
1998 Oregonians confirm their overwhelming support for vote-by-mail by passing Measure 60.
2000 Oregon becomes the first state in the nation to conduct a presidential election entirely by mail. About 80% of registered voters participated.
2019 Oregon becomes the first state not to require paid postage on ballot return envelopes.

Measure 60 eliminated restrictions on vote-by-mail and established it as the single form of voting for elections in Oregon. It also required vote-by-mail to be used for biennial primaries and general elections as well as eliminating polling places.

Supporters
Organizations which supported the initiative included the League of Women Voters of Oregon, the Oregon League of Conservation Voters, AARP of Oregon, and Oregon Education Association. Individuals which supported the measure included then-Governor John Kitzhaber, Oregon Secretary of State Phil Keisling, and former U.S. Senator Mark Hatfield. Supporters of the measure asserted that it would increase voter participation and make elections more convenient for voters. The State of Oregon would also save an estimated $3 million a year, in years which a primary and general election occur.

Opponents
Notable opposition to the measure included State Representative Lynn Snodgrass and anti-tax activist Bill Sizemore. Opponents claimed the system would invite election fraud as well as the possibility of people pressuring each other in terms of how they vote.

Lasting popularity
Vote-by-mail in Oregon has maintained a high level of support since it was passed in 1998. A survey done in 2003 by Dr. Priscilla Southwell, a professor of Political Science at University of Oregon, shows that 81% of respondents favored the vote-by-mail system while 19% favored traditional voting at poll booths. The poll also shows high favorability among both registered Democrats (85%) and Republicans (76%). Thirty percent of respondents said they voted more often since vote-by-mail was enacted.

See also
 Elections in Oregon
 List of Oregon ballot measures

References

1998 in the United States
1998 referendums
Initiatives in the United States
1998 Oregon ballot measures
1998 Oregon elections